Galabnik (Bulgarian: Гълъбник) is a village in western Bulgaria. Its located in Oblast Pernik, Obshtina Radomir.

Geography 
Galabnik is located in the Radomir valley. There is a railway line Sofia-Pernik-Dupnitsa-Blagoevgrad-Petrich.

History 
The old name of the village is Muzibek, which is also retained by a later stage of Turkish presence in the region and the technical bey (Musabey). On September 21, 1972, a road accident near the village killed 11 people from the military parachuting team of Czechoslovakia and the Bulgarian doctor and translator of the team - the bus in which they were traveling was hit by a train at an unguarded level crossing.

Landmarks 
There are excavations and discovered objects of some of the first settlers on the Bulgarian territory.

References 

 grao.bg

Villages in Pernik Province